Matheo Raab (born 18 December 1998) is a German professional footballer who plays as a goalkeeper for  club Hamburger SV.

Club career
On 3 June 2022, Raab signed a four-year contract with Hamburger SV.

References

Living people
1998 births
People from Weilburg
Sportspeople from Giessen (region)
German footballers
Footballers from Hesse
Association football goalkeepers
SV Eintracht Trier 05 players
1. FC Kaiserslautern players
1. FC Kaiserslautern II players
Hamburger SV players
3. Liga players
Oberliga (football) players
21st-century German people